Hendrik Merkus, Baron de Kock (25 May 1779 – 12 April 1845) was a Dutch general and nobleman who served in the Batavian Navy as Lieutenant Governor-General of the Dutch East Indies from 1826 to 1830. He also was Minister of the Interior of the Netherlands from 1836 to 1841.

Biography
Hendrik Merkus de Kock was born on 25 May 1779 in Heusden in the Republic of the United Netherlands. His father was Johannes Conradus de Kock, a banker who was guillotined in Paris, and his mother Maria Petronella Merkus.

In 1801, he joined the Batavian Navy, and by 1807 was posted to the Dutch East Indies. In 1821 he commanded a military expedition to Palembang to suppress a local uprising. Later, as Lieutenant Governor-General (1826–1830), De Kock led the fight against Prince Diponegoro in the Java War.

The triumphant commander was declared a baron in 1835, and served in the Dutch Government as Minister of the Interior from 1836 to 1841. He was Minister of State from 1841 to 1845. He remained a member of the First Chamber of parliament until his death. He died in The Hague on 12 April 1845.

Honors 
 Knight in the Order of the Union (1807)
 Commander in the Order of the Union (1808)
 Commander in the Order of the Reunion (1812)
 Knight 3rd Class Military William Order (1815)
 Commander Military William Order (1821)
 Grand Cross Military William Order (1830)
 Grand Cross Order of the Netherlands Lion (1841)

References

External links 
 

1779 births
1845 deaths
Dutch military personnel of the Napoleonic Wars
Royal Netherlands East Indies Army generals
Barons of the Netherlands
Knights Commander of the Military Order of William
Knights Grand Cross of the Military Order of William
People from Heusden